Nicolas Gunvarson Sandberg (born 24 December 1991) is a Swedish footballer who plays for Lindome GIF as a forward.

References

External links
Elite Prospect profile

1991 births
Living people
Swedish footballers
Association football forwards
Allsvenskan players
Superettan players
Örgryte IS players
FC Vestsjælland players